The black agouti (Dasyprocta fuliginosa) is a South American species of agouti from the family Dasyproctidae.

Distribution and habitat
It is found in the northwestern Amazon in southern Venezuela, eastern Colombia, eastern Ecuador, western Brazil and northeastern Peru. There is also a disjunct population in the Magdalena River Valley of northern Colombia. They are found in forests, thick brush, savannas, and cultivated areas. In Peru, they are confined to the Amazonian region where they are found in all parts of the low selva zone and many parts of the high selva zone. Agoutis live in close proximity to water, being found on the banks of all types of streams.

Description
It is overall black grizzled white, and the throat is white. The black agouti weighs .

Behavior
Like other agoutis, the black agouti is diurnal, lives alone or in pairs, and feeds on fruits and nuts. In some areas, they construct burrows among limestone boulders, along river banks, or under the roots of trees.

Reproduction 
The female black agouti is capable of breeding year-round. Also, they are considered to be seasonally polyestrous, meaning the females can go through more than one period of estrus in a single year. One estrus period can last for 24 hours while the estrous cycle can last between 30 and 34 days. Furthermore, the gestation period averages 104 days, and females are able to produce two newborns per litter.

References 

 John F. Eisenberg and Kent H. Redford, 2000. Mammals of Neotropics: Ecuador, Bolivia and Brazil.

Dasyprocta
Mammals of Brazil
Mammals of Colombia
Mammals of Ecuador
Mammals of Peru
Mammals of Venezuela
Fauna of the Amazon
Magdalena River
Mammals described in 1832